Lord Hood may refer to:

Viscount Hood, a title in the peerage of Great Britain
Samuel Hood, 1st Viscount Hood, a British Admiral
Fleet Admiral Lord Terrence Hood, a fictional character in the Halo video-game franchise